Jürgen Böttcher (pseudonym Strawalde, born 8 July 1931) is a German film director and painter. He is best known for his film Born in '45.

See also 
 A. R. Penck

References

External links 

1931 births
Living people
German documentary film directors
People from Frankenberg, Saxony
Film directors from Saxony